Joshua Laws (born 26 February 1998) is an Australian professional footballer who plays as a central defender for Wellington Phoenix.

References

External links

1998 births
Living people
Australian soccer players
Association football midfielders
Blackburn Rovers F.C. players
Fortuna Düsseldorf players
Wellington Phoenix FC players
A-League Men players
Australian expatriate sportspeople in Germany
Australian expatriate sportspeople in England
Australian expatriate sportspeople in New Zealand